Jean-Christophe Victor (30 May 1947 – 28 December 2016) was a political scientist focusing on international relations. He was the son of the polar explorer Paul-Emile Victor and the television producer Éliane Decrais. He earned master's degrees in Chinese at the National Institute for Oriental Languages and Civilizations, and in political sciences at the University of Paris-1 (1982), as well as a PhD in ethnology on Nepal. He was posted as a diplomat in Afghanistan, worked as policy adviser at NATO in Brussels, and for the Policy Planning Office at the French Ministry of Foreign Affairs.

He was the founder and the director of LEPAC, the Center for Political Studies and Cartographic Analysis, a Paris-based think tank. The LEPAC trains international managers in the corporate sector for companies such as Veolia, Vinci, Areva, British Petroleum, Cartier, and L’Oréal; and public sector organisations including RATP, Council of Europe, and the European Union.

Victor taught geopolitics in France and in several foreign universities. The last books he authored on geopolitics are:

 "Le dessous des cartes : Itinéraires géopolitiques" (Beneath the Maps: Geopolitical Routes) 2011, Paris
 "Political Atlas for Teenagers" 2010 ; Paris
 "Atlas for a Changing World" 2008, Paris, Berlin, Seoul, Tokyo, Taipei.

He was the author of a weekly program on the Franco-German channel ARTE and the French international channel TV5Monde, dealing with geopolitics: "Le dessous des cartes" ("Beneath the Maps").

Jean-Christophe Victor died on 28 December 2016 from a heart attack.

Bibliography 
 Itinéraires géopolitiques, Atlas du dessous des cartes, 2011, Editions Tallandier/Arte Editions
 Le dessous des cartes - Atlas Junior, 2010, (avec Dominique Fouchard et Catherine Barichnikoff), Editions Tallandier
 2007, (avec Paul-Emile Victor) Adieu l'Antarctique, Laffont, Paris
 2007, (avec Virginie Raisson et Frank Tétart) Le dessous des cartes - Atlas d'un monde qui change, Editions Tallandier
 2005, (avec Virginie Raisson et Frank Tétart) Le dessous des cartes - Atlas géopolitique, Editions Tallandier
 1993, L'enjeu afghan ou La cité des murmures, Editions Lattès, Paris
 1992, Planète Antarctique (avec Paul-Émile Victor), Laffont, Paris
 1985, Armes : France Troisième Grand, éditions Autrement, Paris

References

External links 
 Official web site of the tv program
Lepac web site, his think tank

1947 births
2016 deaths
French political scientists
French geographers
French male non-fiction writers
French people of Polish-Jewish descent
French television presenters